The Third Society Party (TSP) is a Taiwanese political party headed by Jou Yi-Cheng, a former DPP member. The main purpose of the party is to address the voices of the middle people, people who are undecided about the constant political deadlock between the KMT and the DPP.

Policies
The members of the party want no part in the ongoing political struggle between DPP and KMT, but instead wish to be the "peace-keepers" between the two major parties.

The TSP declared that it will not support any of the candidates fielded by the Pan-Greens or the Pan-Blues in the presidential election of 2008.

The position of the new party on Taiwanese national identity is that the Taiwanese community, comprising the 23 million people in Taiwan and its outlying islands, is an independent and sovereign nation, with the Republic of China as its constitutional name. TSP believes that the independent status of Taiwan fits the interests of most 
Taiwanese.

History
TSP has called for establishment of the country's "eighth constitutional reform"—or the "third republic" constitutional reform—calling for a parliamentary system of government; single-member constituency and two-vote electoral system; the holding of a nationwide referendum on the content of a new constitution; and lowering the threshold to initiate constitutional reforms.

Future 
The new party, formally established in mid-September 2007, would field candidates in the next legislative elections scheduled for Jan. 12, 2008, but it would not nominate any candidate for the upcoming presidential election, nor support the candidate of any party.

For the legislative elections, the party plans to focus on the second ballot, where a person votes for a party, rather than the first ballot for a candidate (referring to the voting process under the new "single-constituency, two-ballots" system, to be implemented in the January 2008 voting).

Thirteen people were on the first TSP list of potential legislative candidates, including Wu Rwei-ren, an assistant researcher with Academia Sinica's Institute of Taiwan History, Lee Ting-tsan, a professor with the Institute of Sociology, National Tsing Hua University, and also including scholars who were regarded as close to the DPP in stance.

See also
 List of political parties in Taiwan

External links
Official website

2007 establishments in Taiwan
Political parties established in 2007
Political parties in Taiwan
Social democratic parties in Taiwan